733 Naval Air Squadron (733 NAS) was a Naval Air Squadron of the Royal Navy's Fleet Air Arm. It was active between 1944 and 1947 as a Fleet Requirement Unit, based mainly at RNAS Trincomalee (HMS Bambara), China Bay, Sri Lanka (Ceylon).

History of 733 NAS

Fleet Requirement Unit (1944 - 1947) 

733 Naval Air Squadron was a Fleet Requirement Unit. It moved from R.N. Air Section Minnerya, in lodger facilities at R.A.F. Station Minnerya, located in Hingurakgoda, Sri Lanka (Ceylon), on the 25 March 1944, to RNAS Trincomalee (HMS Bambara), located in China Bay in eastern Sri Lanka, bringing along a varied example of aircraft used by the Fleet Air Arm.

Initially using Walrus aircraft and later on Sea Otter aircraft, an Air Sea Rescue Flight was added around the beginning of 1946.

The squadron disbanded on 31 December 1947 at RNAS Trincomalee.

Aircraft flown 

733 Naval Air Squadron has flown a number of different aircraft types, including:

 Fairey Albacore 
 Grumman Tarpon GR.I
 Grumman Avenger Mk.II
 Fairey Barracuda Mk II
 Bristol Beaufighter Mark IIF
 Bristol Beaufort Mk.I
  Vought Corsair Mk IV
 Bolton Paul Defiant TT Mk I
  Beech Expeditor C.II
  Fairey Fulmar Mk.II
 North American Harvard IIB
 Miles Martinet TT.Mk I
 de Havilland Mosquito B Mk 25
 Stinson Reliant
 Supermarine Seafire III
 Supermarine Seafire F Mk XV
 Supermarine Sea Otter Mk I
 Supermarine Sea Otter Mk II
 Fairey Swordfish I
 Fairey Swordfish II
 de Havilland Tiger Moth
 Vultee Vengeance II
 Supermarine Walrus
 Grumman Wildcat Mk V

Naval Air Stations 

733 Naval Air Squadron operated from a couple of naval air stations of the Royal Navy, overseas:
R. N. Air Section  MINNERIYA (1 January 1944 - 25 March 1944)
Royal Naval Air Station TRINCOMALEE (25 March 1944 - 31 December 1947)

References

Citations

Bibliography

700 series Fleet Air Arm squadrons
Military units and formations established in 1944
Air squadrons of the Royal Navy in World War II